Chen Jie (born 28 February 1995) is a Chinese swimmer. She competed in the women's 200 metre backstroke event at the 2016 Summer Olympics.

Notes

References

External links
 

1995 births
Living people
Chinese female backstroke swimmers
Olympic swimmers of China
Swimmers at the 2016 Summer Olympics
Swimmers from Wuhan
Asian Games medalists in swimming
Asian Games silver medalists for China
Asian Games bronze medalists for China
Medalists at the 2014 Asian Games
Medalists at the 2018 Asian Games
Swimmers at the 2014 Asian Games
Swimmers at the 2018 Asian Games
Swimmers at the 2020 Summer Olympics
21st-century Chinese women